Cephetola martini is a butterfly in the family Lycaenidae. It is found in Cameroon, Uganda and north-western Tanzania. Its habitat consists of forests.

References

Butterflies described in 1998
Poritiinae